The Cathedral of the Immaculate Conception is a Catholic cathedral in Kansas City, Missouri, United States. Along with the Cathedral of St. Joseph it is the seat of the Diocese of Kansas City-St. Joseph. It is a contributing property in the Quality Hill neighborhood, which is listed on the National Register of Historic Places.

History
The Rev. Benedict Roux arrived in Kansas City in 1833. Two years later he built a church out of logs at Eleventh and Broadway that was named St. John Francis Regis. From 1845 to 1880 the parish was served by the Rev. Bernard Donnelly who was a circuit-riding priest. He had a brick church built in 1857 that was named Immaculate Conception.

The Diocese of Kansas City was established by Pope Leo XIII in 1880. Bishop John Joseph Hogan selected Immaculate Conception as the cathedral for the new diocese and laid the cornerstone for the present cathedral in 1882. While the interior of the building was incomplete and temporary windows filled the spaces, the first Mass in the church was celebrated on Trinity Sunday in 1883.  The Cathedral was built on the highest ground of the city and at 150 feet (37.6 m) it was the tallest structure in Kansas City at the time. During the early years, the parish sold tickets to allowing residents to climb the steps in the tower to see the view.

A carillon of eleven bells was placed in the tower in 1895. The bells are named after the following saints: St. Anna, St. Bernard, St. Catherine, St. Cecilia, St. Edward, St. Elizabeth, St. Helen, St. John, St. Mary and St. Thomas. The largest bell, St. Thomas, is rung more than the others. The stained glass windows, created by local artisans at the Kansas City Stained Glass Works Company, were installed in 1912.  The windows depict various Biblical scenes and the life of Christ.  From 1903 to 1945 the Cathedral operated St. Christopher's Inn, on Main Street, a Single Room Occupancy facility for homeless men.

Bishop Edwin V. O’Hara led a major renovation of the cathedral's interior in 1955. On August 29, 1956, Pope Pius XII merged the western part of the Diocese of St. Joseph with the northern part of Diocese of Kansas City to form the Diocese of Kansas City–St. Joseph. The rest of what was the Kansas City Diocese became part of the newly established Diocese of Springfield-Cape Girardeau. As a result, the Diocese of Kansas City-St. Joseph has Co-Cathedrals: the Cathedral of the Immaculate Conception and the Cathedral of St. Joseph.

The copper dome on the cathedral tower started to deteriorate. It was replaced by a new dome, cupola and cross covered in 23-carat gold leaf in an effort led by Bishop John Cody in 1960. A diocesan capital campaign, Gift of Faith, began in 2001 to provide necessary funds for another major renovation and restoration of the cathedral. Bishop Raymond J. Boland dedicated the renewed cathedral on February 23, 2003.

See also

 List of Catholic cathedrals in the United States
 List of cathedrals in the United States

References

External links

  Official Cathedral Site
 Diocese of Kansas City-St. Joseph Official Site

Religious organizations established in 1857
Roman Catholic churches completed in 1883
Immaculate Conception (Kansas City, Missouri)
Roman Catholic churches in Kansas City, Missouri
Historic district contributing properties in Missouri
1857 establishments in Missouri
Churches on the National Register of Historic Places in Missouri
Church buildings with domes
National Register of Historic Places in Kansas City, Missouri
19th-century Roman Catholic church buildings in the United States